Captain General of the Air Force ( or ) is a five-star air force officer rank and the highest rank of the Spanish Air Force.  The five-star NATO rank code is OF-10. The honorary appointments formally ceased in 1999. The rank of Air captain general is equivalent to a Marshal of the Air Force in many nations such as the United Kingdom, a general of the Air Force of the United States, a capitain general of the Spanish Army or the Navy. This rank is reserved to the monarch as Commander-in-chief. An Air captain general's insignia consists of two command sticks under five four-pointed stars below the Royal Crown and a golden string.

The Spanish Air Force as a separated branch of the Spanish Armed Forces was officially established on 7 October 1939, after the Spanish Civil War. Francisco Franco as head of Spanish state and commander-in-chief named himself 1st captain general of the Spanish Air Force. General Ángel Salas Larrazábal, a veteran fighter pilot, has been the only honorary Air captain general (1991-1994).

List of Captain generals

See also 
Captain general
Captain general of the Spanish Army
Captain general of the Spanish Navy
Spanish Air Force

Notes

References 

Captain General ASAVE Website.